The 1993 1. divisjon, Norway's second-tier football league, began play on 2 May 1993 and ended on 3 October 1993. The league was contested by 24 teams, divided in two groups and the winner of each group won promotion to Tippeligaen, while the runners-up played a promotion-playoff against the 10th placed team in the 1993 Tippeligaen. The bottom three teams were relegated to the 2. divisjon.

Vålerenga and Sogndal won promotion to Tippeligaen as group winners, while Strømsgodset was promoted after the promotion-playoff, where they beat Molde and Bryne. Åssiden, Elverum, Strømmen, Djerv 1919, Ski and Aalesund was relegated to the 2. divisjon.

League tables

Group A

Group B

See also
 1993 Tippeligaen
 1993 2. divisjon

References

Norwegian First Division seasons
2
Norway
Norway